The 2013–14 Professional Football League was the twenty-third season of a third division in Russian football and the first under this name. The Professional Football League is geographically divided into 5 zones.
The winners of each zone are automatically promoted into the National Football League. The bottom finishers of each zone lose professional status and are relegated into the Amateur Football League.

West

Standings

Top scorers
Source: rfspro.ru 
20 goals
Anzor Sanaya (Tekstilshchik)
15 goals
Yevgeni Kobzar (Lokomotiv-2)
14 goals
Aleksei Zhdanov (Sever)
13 goals
Yevgeni Losev (Tekstilshchik)
12 goals
Aleksandr Savin (Tosno)
11 goals
Anton Shishayev (Pskov-747)
10 goals
Artyom Motov (Vologda)
Dmitri Proshin (Pskov-747)Maksim Zimarev (Torpedo)Center

Standings

Top scorersSource: rfspro.ru 15 goals 
Aleksandr Degtyaryov (Sokol)13 goals
Vladimir Obukhov (Spartak-2)11 goals
Yevgeni Povarnitsyn (Podolye)Mikhail Tynyany (Tambov)10 goals
Igor Boyarov (Vityaz)Azamat Gonezhukov (Sokol)Vadim Minich (Dynamo Bryansk)Ruslan Shoniya (Vityaz)9 goals
Aleksandr Kozlov (Spartak-2)South

Standings

Top scorersSource: rfspro.ru 22 goals
Sergei Verkashanskiy (Chernomorets)20 goals
Aleksandr Alkhazov (Volgar)19 goals
Dmitry Akhba (Volgar)16 goals
Anatoly Shevchenko (Chernomorets)13 goals
Viktor Borisov (Olimpia)Tofik Kadimov (Dagdizel)Dzambolat Khastsayev (Alania-d)12 goals
Roman Smolskiy (MITOS)11 goals
Mikhail Biryukov (SKVO)10 goals
Oleg Aleynik (Olimpia)Sergei Sinyayev (Chernomorets)Ural-Povolzhye

Standings

Top scorersSource: rfspro.ru 16 goals
Dmitri Zarva (Chelyabinsk)9 goals
Marat Safin (Volga)Denis Uryvkov (Chelyabinsk)7 goals
Mikhail Kanayev (Tyumen)Andrei Samoylov (Syzran-2003)East

Standings

Top scorersSource: rfspro.ru 8 goals
Anton Bagayev (Irtysh)Aleksei Nekrasov (Baikal)7 goals
Aleksandr Gagloyev (Sakhalin)Roman Kuklin (Amur-2010)6 goals
Azer Aliyev (Sakhalin)Ibragim Bazayev (Amur-2010)Sergei Vinogradov (Sakhalin)5 goals
Vyacheslav Bokov (Smena)Yakov Ehrlich (Sakhalin)Almaz Fatikhov (Chita)Vyacheslav Kirillov (Chita)Aleksei Sabanov (Sibiryak)''

References

External links
  Official site 
  Website of the Department of Professional Football of the Russian Football Union (DPF RFS)

2013-14
3
Rus